Gurak (also Romanized as Gūrak-e Do; also known as Goorag, Govark, Gūrak, Gvark, and Kavark) is a village in Horjand Rural District, Kuhsaran District, Ravar County, Kerman Province, Iran. At the 2006 census, its population was 311, in 79 families.

References 

Populated places in Ravar County